Khoon Ka Badla Khoon is a 1978 Bollywood action film directed by K. Parvez alias Kalpataru and produced by Ratan Mohan.

Plot 
This is the story of two brothers, separated long ago, are reunited and destroy their enemies.

Cast
 Vinod Khanna   
 Mahendra Sandhu   
 Asha Sachdev   
 Ajit as Al fanzo 
 Bindu   
 Jayshree T.   
 Padma Khanna   
 Purnima as Mrs. Kotwal
 Iftekhar as Commissioner Kotwal
 Mohan Choti   
 Imtiaz Khan
 P. Jairaj		
 Viju Khote
 Arpana Choudhary 	
 Shetty		
 Sudhir

Music
S. H. Bihari wrote all songs except "Aji Hoga Kya Aage Janaab" (Ram Bhardwaj)

 "Badan Gora Haseen Jalwe Tumko Deewaana Meri Jaan" (Vani Jayaram)
 "Ghar Apna Bangaal Aur Bambai Mein Hai Sasuraal" (Pushpa Pagdhare, Uttara Kelkar, Vani Jayaram)
 "Gham Yateemon Ke Jaisa Bhi Sansaar Main Koi Bachcha" (Uttara Kelkar, Vani Jayaram)
 "Kisko Gale Lagaaye Dil Kiska Todiye" (Vani Jayaram)
 "Pyaar Bhara Kajara Aankhiyon Mein Daal Ke" (Pushpa Pagdhare, Uttara Kelkar, Vani Jayaram)
 "Aji Hoga Kya Aage Janaab" (Mohammed Rafi, Vani Jayaram)
 "Zulf Lehraayi To Saawan Ka Mahina Aa Gaya" (Vani Jayaram)

References

External links
 

1978 films
1970s Hindi-language films
Films scored by O. P. Nayyar
Films directed by Kalpataru
Indian action drama films